Jacek Józef Dukaj (born 30 July 1974) is a Polish science fiction and fantasy writer. He has received numerous literary prizes including the European Union Prize for Literature and Janusz A. Zajdel Award.

Career

He was born on 30 July 1974 in Tarnów. He graduated from High School No. 3 in Tarnów and subsequently studied philosophy at the Jagiellonian University in Kraków. He made his literary debut at the age of 16 when he published his short story Złota galera (The Golden Galley) in the Fantastyka science-fiction monthly. In 1997, he published his first novel Xavras Wyżryn. His texts and short stories were featured in such science-fiction and fantasy magazines as Nowa Fantastyka, Sfinks, Framzet, Fantom, Fenix, Science Fiction and Czas Fantastyki.

His short stories have been translated into English, German, Russian, Czech, Slovak, Macedonian, Hungarian, Italian, Bulgarian. His first story, The Golden Galley, was translated into English by Wiesiek Powaga and published in The Dedalus Book of Polish Fantasy. Michael Kandel's translation of "The Iron General" has been published in A Polish Book of Monsters and his translation of fragments of The Cathedral into English is available online. The Cathedral served as the basis for the 2002 Academy Award-nominated science-fiction short film of the same name directed by Tomasz Bagiński.

In 2007, he published one of the most successful of his novels entitled Ice for which he won the Janusz A. Zajdel Award, European Union Prize for Literature and Kościelski Award. In 2009, he published Wroniec whose action takes place in the background of the 1981 martial law in Poland.

The Apocrypha of Lem, a mock-review in Lem's tradition, written as an afterword for reedition of Lem's A Perfect Vacuum, was published in "Lemistry", translated by Danuta Stok. The Old Axolotl is the first book of Dukaj published in English (in 2015). The novel inspired a 2020 Netflix-original Belgian TV series Into the Night. In 2017, English language rights to Ice were acquired by London-based publisher Head of Zeus. The publication date will be announced once the novel is translated.

As of 2021, Jacek Dukaj is also involved in business, being main shareholder and CEO of Nolensum company, founded to produce video games based on his stories and original ideas,  as well as shareholder and member of Board of Directors of Bellwether Rocks, an investment fund with focus on gamedev industry and tokenization, NFTs, crypto etc.

Style and themes
His works frequently feature elements of cyberpunk, alternative history, and horror stories. The use of religious themes is one of the most distinctive features of Dukaj's novels. They were already present in The Golden Galley, his literary debut. The author is also known for undertaking literary experiments manifesting themselves in the combination of elements of fantasy with science fiction as is the case with The Iron General (2015).

Dukaj has stated that creating a cohesive vision of the universe in a particular work is the basis of any good fantasy or science fiction book. Hence his books scrupulously describe the scientific aspects governing this universe and make use of elaborate scientific terminology. The realism in presenting the boundaries of human understanding might be inspired by the works of Stanisław Lem, which introduce the theme of the wear and tear of future inventions. The secret relationship between science and power is also explored in Dukaj's works, most notably in Black Oceans (2001), which is reminiscent of Lem's  His Master's Voice (1968).

Bibliography

Novels
Xavras Wyżryn (SuperNOWA, 1997, contains two short novels - Xavras Wyżryn and Zanim noc)
Czarne oceany (Black Oceans) (SuperNOWA, 2001) 
Extensa (Extensa) (Wydawnictwo Literackie, 2002) 
Inne pieśni (translated as Different Chants or Other Songs) (Wydawnictwo Literackie, 2003) 
Perfekcyjna niedoskonałość (An Ideal Imperfection) (Wydawnictwo Literackie, 2004) 
Ice (Lód) (Wydawnictwo Literackie, 2007) 
Wroniec (The Crow) (Wydawnictwo Literackie, 2009) 
Starość aksolotla (The Old Axolotl) (Allegro, 2015)
 (The Cloud Empire) (SQN, 2018, titled Other Worlds; WL, 2020, extended version); a 2019 winner of the

Awards and nominations
Śląkfa, Author of the Year: 2000, 2007, 2009
Nautilus Award: 2003, 2004, 2007 
Angelus Award nomination: 2007
Nike Award nomination: 2007
Kościelski Award: 2008, novel Ice
European Union Prize for Literature: Polish section, 2009, novel Ice
Paszport Polityki nomination: 2009
Janusz A. Zajdel Award: 2010
Bronze Medal for Merit to Culture – Gloria Artis from the Ministry of Culture and National Heritage of the Republic of Poland: 11 December 2013

References

 Jacek Dukaj's Official Website in Polish
 Jacek Dukaj's Official Website in English
 Jacek Dukaj's company's website

External links 

 Excerpts from the novel Ice 
 Passages from The Cathedral
 Passages from Iron General
 Passages from Black Oceans
 Passages from Other Songs
 More about contemporary Polish fantasy and sci-fi
 The Old Axolotl: Man without Body, Book without Paper

Polish science fiction writers
Polish alternate history writers
People from Tarnów
1974 births
Living people
Recipients of the Bronze Medal for Merit to Culture – Gloria Artis
Electronic literature writers